Zelaya or Celaya is a Basque surname.  Both are variant spellings of Zelaia, a habitational name in Biscay province, Basque Country, from the Basque language zelai ('field' or 'meadow') and the definite article -a.  

Notable people with the surname include:
 Carlos Zelaya, a graffiti artist who contributed to the video game Skitchin'
 Emilio José Zelaya (born 1987, San Miguel de Tucumán), an Argentine football forward
 Francisco Zelaya y Ayes (1798 - 1848), President of Honduras
 Héctor Ramón Zelaya (Rivera) (born 1958), a Honduran football player
 José Santos Zelaya former president (1893-1909) of Nicaragua
 Juan Nepomuceno Fernández Lindo y Zelaya (1790, Tegucigalpa, Honduras - 1857, Gracias)
 Luis Selvin Zelaya Bran (born 1979, San Salvador, El Salvador), a Salvadoran professional soccer player
 Manuel Antonio Alberto Zelaya (born 1958), a Honduran politician
 Manuel Zelaya, former president (2006-2009) of Honduras
 Nelson Fabián Zelaya (born 1973, Asunción), a Paraguayan football defender
 Rodolfo Antonio Zelaya (García) (born 1988, Usulutan), a Salvadoran footballer
 Xiomara Castro de Zelaya, the 56th President and first female President of Honduras

Basque-language surnames